The Communist Left was a political party in Chile. The party was founded by Senator Manuel Hidalgo in 1931, as a split from the Communist Party of Chile. The organization organized various illegal trade unions. In 1937 the party merged into the Socialist Party.

References

Political parties established in 1931
Political parties disestablished in 1937
Communist parties in Chile
Defunct political parties in Chile
1931 establishments in Chile
1937 disestablishments in Chile
Trotskyist organisations in Chile